Schembria is a genus of parasitic flies in the family Tachinidae. There are at least two described species in Schembria.

Species
These two species belong to the genus Schembria:
 Schembria eldana Barraclough, 1991
 Schembria meridionalis Rondani, 1861

References

Further reading

 
 
 
 

Tachinidae
Articles created by Qbugbot
Taxa named by Camillo Rondani